Akste Nature Reserve is a nature reserve in Vastse-Kuuste, Põlva County, Estonia. The area is 189.2 ha. The nature reserve was established in 1977 to protect the woodcock.

References 

Nature reserves in Estonia
Geography of Põlva County